Dawki or Dauki is a town in West Jaintia Hills district, Meghalaya, India.

Geography

Dawki Border-crossing

Dawki Integrated Check Post or Dawki border crossing is on Dawki-Tamabil is one of the few road border crossings between India and Bangladesh in West Jaintia Hills district in the state of Meghalaya, India, the corresponding post in Bangladesh is Tamabil post. Dawki ICP foundation stone was laid in January 2017 and will become operation in 2-18. It is used mainly for coal transportation to Bangladesh. Some 500 trucks cross the border every day in peak season.

Some shared transport is available from Iewduh in Shillong to the border post at Dawki every morning. Buses are also available for the  journey from Shillong.

Places of interest

Dawki Bridge, is a suspension bridge over the Umngot River. It was constructed in 1932 by the British.

See also

 Living Root Bridge: type suspension bridge created with living plant roots

References

External links

About Dawki
 About Dawki Bridge

Cities and towns in West Jaintia Hills district
Bangladesh–India border crossings
West Jaintia Hills district